José María Valencia Barajas (born 20 April 1963) is a Mexican politician from the Party of the Democratic Revolution.

Career
From 2009 to 2012 he served as Deputy of the LXI Legislature of the Mexican Congress representing Michoacán.

References

1963 births
Living people
Politicians from Michoacán
Members of the Chamber of Deputies (Mexico)
Party of the Democratic Revolution politicians
21st-century Mexican politicians